is a passenger railway station  located in the city of Minamiashigara, Kanagawa Prefecture, Japan, operated by the Izuhakone Railway.

Lines
Fujifilm-Mae Station is served by the  Daiyūzan Line, and is located 9.1 kilometers from the line’s terminus at Odawara Station.

Station layout
The station consists of a single side platform connected to a small one-story station building, which is staffed only during peak commuting hours.

Adjacent stations

History
Fujifilm-Mae Station was opened on August 13, 1956. As the name implies, it is located near the entrance to a large factory complex owned by the Fujifilm company.

Passenger statistics
In fiscal 2019, the station was used by an average of 663 passengers daily (boarding passengers only).

The passenger figures (boarding passengers only) for previous years are as shown below.

Surrounding area
The Kaizawa River, which is a tributary of the Kari River, flows in front of the station.

See also
List of railway stations in Japan

References

External links

Izuhakone Railway home page 

Railway stations in Japan opened in 1956
Izuhakone Daiyuzan Line
Railway stations in Kanagawa Prefecture
Minamiashigara, Kanagawa